Aringa may refer to:
 Aringa people
 Aringa language
 Aringa County

Language and nationality disambiguation pages